Edem Mahu is a Ghanaian geoscientist who is a senior lecturer at the University of Ghana. Her research considers ocean health, oyster fisheries and climate change. She was awarded the 2022 American Geophysical Union Africa Award for Research Excellence in Ocean Sciences.

Early life and education 
Mahu applied to study medicine at university, but decided to move into oceanography and fisheries. She earned her doctorate in oceanography at the University of Ghana. Her research made use of radioisotopes in reconstructing the pollution history of heavy metals in the shores of the Gulf of Guinea. She analyzed sediment cores and built a database that described trace metal distribution and toxicity. During her doctoral research, she completed two research placements in the San Jose State University, where she worked at the Moss Landing Marine Laboratories. After earning her doctorate, Mahu became the first marine biogeochemist in Ghana.

Research and career 
Mahu started working on an Organization for Women in Science for the Developing World project to develop cheap android coupled soil nutrient test kits for Ghanaian farmlands. Mahu works on an International Foundation for Science project that looks to understand the toxicity of heavy metal pollution in Ghana. She is a member of "Employment of female researchers in Key Assignments" (ERIKA), part of the Partnership for Observation of the Global Oceans (POGO) forum that looks to improve the representation of women in marine research.

Mahu's research seeks to improve water quality and diversity in Ghana.

Awards and honors 
 2020 Affiliate of the African Academy of Sciences
 2020 Royal Society Future Leaders – African Independent Research (FLAIR) fellowship
 2021 National Geographic Society Emerging Explorer Award
 2022 American Geophysical Union Africa Award for Research Excellence in Ocean Sciences

Selected publications

References 

Living people
Year of birth missing (living people)
University of Ghana alumni

Academic staff of the University of Ghana
Ghanaian scientists